The Touring Club Italiano (TCI) (Italian Touring Club or Touring Club of Italy) is the major Italian national tourist organization.

It published its first maps in 1897. By 1899, it had 16,000 members. With the new century, it promoted tourism in all its forms – including auto tourism – and the appreciation of the natural and urban environments. Under fascism, starting in 1937, it was forced to Italianize its name to the Consociazione Turistica Italiana.

Through the years, it has produced a wide variety of maps, guidebooks, and more specialized studies, and is known for its high standard of cartography.  Its detailed road maps of Italy are published at 1:200,000, one per region.

Publishing activity 
Its most prestigious guidebooks are the "Guide Rosse" (not to be confused with the Michelin Red Guides), which cover Italy in 23 highly detailed volumes printed on bible paper; the TCI also produces a wide variety of other guides to Italy. During the Fascist period, the red guides were also extended to cover Italian colonies and overseas territories.

Among many other publications the Touring Club Italiano, along with Club Alpino Italiano, published between 1908 and 2013 the Guida dei Monti d'Italia (in English Guidebook to the Italian mountains), a series of guidebooks covering all the mountain ranges of Italy.

The TCI also publishes translations of foreign guidebooks such as the French Guide Bleu.

See also
 Atlante Internazionale del Touring Club Italiano, an international atlas published by the TCI.

Notes

Further reading
  circa 1900?
 
 
 
 
 
 
 
 Guida Gastronomica d'Italia, 1931,

External links
 Official site

Tourism agencies
Tourism in Italy
1894 establishments in Italy
Travel guide books